Moshions is a Rwandan clothing store, fashion house and brand that designs apparel and accessories. It was founded in 2015 in Kigali by Moses Turahirwa.

History
Moshions was established in 2015 as a brand for menswear. The brand has since grown to more production segments including womenswear and accessories. The brand also outfitted Manneken Pis for Rwanda Liberation Day Ceremony and robot Sophia.

Awards

 2016: Made in Rwanda Emerging Enterprise of the Year Award

2018: Rwanda's Best Local Fashion House by RDB
2020: Emerging Made in Rwanda Entreprise of the Year

References

External links
 
Future heritage and fashion design: Rwandan traditional culture in the global market

Clothing brands
2015 establishments in Africa